The  is a singles title in the Japanese professional wrestling promotion DDT Pro-Wrestling. The title was established in 2006 and it is mostly defended in stipulation matches, with the defending champion being given the right to choose the stipulation. The title has also been defended at events held by Union Pro Wrestling, one of DDT's former sub-brands. , there have been a total of 56 reigns shared between 33 different champions.

The current title holder is Jun Akiyama, who is in his first reign as champion.

Title history

Combined reigns

See also

Professional wrestling in Japan

References

External links
 DDT Extreme Championship

DDT Pro-Wrestling championships
Hardcore wrestling championships